Dana Hussain Abdul-Razak Al-Khafaji (born January 3, 1986) is a sprinter on Iraq's national track and field team, coached by Yousif Abdul-Rahman.
Due to the International Olympic Committee ban on Iraq competing at the 2008 Summer Olympics, there were concerns that she might be unable to participate, despite qualifying for the 100- and 200-meter sprint events. The ban was, however, subsequently lifted. She was the only athlete on Iraq's 2008 Olympic team to train within the war-torn country. In Beijing she competed at the 100 metres sprint. In her first round heat she placed sixth in a time of 12.36 which was not enough to advance to the second round.

In 2011 Athletics at the 2011 Pan Arab Games Abdul-razak won Gold for 100 metres event of 11.88 which she won Silver in a 200 metres sprint on 24.61 and in 400 metres sprint she won Bronze of 55.48.

Dana was the Iraqi flag bearer during the London 2012 Summer Olympics opening ceremony.

See also
 Alaa Jassim

References

External links
 "Dana Hussein Abdul-Razzaq", no. 99 on Time’s list of "100 Olympic Athletes To Watch"
 

1986 births
Living people
Iraqi female sprinters
Olympic athletes of Iraq
Athletes (track and field) at the 2008 Summer Olympics
Athletes (track and field) at the 2012 Summer Olympics
Sportspeople from Baghdad
Athletes (track and field) at the 2006 Asian Games
Athletes (track and field) at the 2010 Asian Games
Athletes (track and field) at the 2014 Asian Games
Athletes (track and field) at the 2018 Asian Games
World Athletics Championships athletes for Iraq
Asian Games competitors for Iraq